Andreas Kaiser (born 4 May 1964) is a retired German football player.

References

External links
 

1964 births
Living people
German footballers
Fortuna Düsseldorf players
Bundesliga players
2. Bundesliga players
Association football midfielders